You Must First Learn to Draw the Real is the fourth studio album by American noise rock band Gravitar. It was released on November 9, 1999 by Monotremata Records.

Track listing

Personnel 
Adapted from the You Must First Learn to Draw the Real liner notes.

Gravitar
 Eric Cook – drums, percussion, production, mastering
 Geoff Walker – vocals, electric guitar
 Michael J. Walker – electric guitar

Production and additional personnel
 John D'Agostini – production, mastering

Release history

References

External links 
 You Must First Learn to Draw the Real at Discogs (list of releases)

1999 albums
Gravitar (band) albums